The voiced alveolar tap or flap is a type of consonantal sound, used in some spoken languages.

The terms tap and flap are often used interchangeably. Peter Ladefoged proposed the distinction that a tap strikes its point of contact directly, as a very brief stop, and a flap strikes the point of contact tangentially: "Flaps are most typically made by retracting the tongue tip behind the alveolar ridge and moving it forward so that it strikes the ridge in passing." That distinction between the alveolar tap and flap can be written in the IPA with tap  and flap , the 'retroflex' symbol being used for the one that starts with the tongue tip curled back behind the alveolar ridge. The distinction is noticeable in the speech of some American English speakers in distinguishing the words "potty" (tap ) and "party" (retroflex ).

Otherwise, alveolars and dentals are typically called taps and other articulations flaps. No language contrasts a tap and a flap at the same place of articulation.

The sound is often analyzed and thus interpreted by non-native English-speakers as an 'R-sound' in many foreign languages. In languages for which the segment is present but not phonemic, it is often an allophone of either an alveolar stop (or both) or a rhotic consonant (like the alveolar trill or the alveolar approximant).

If the alveolar flap is the only rhotic consonant in the language, it may be transcribed with  although that symbol technically represents the trill.

The voiced alveolar tapped fricative reported from some languages is actually a very brief voiced alveolar non-sibilant fricative.

Voiced alveolar tap and flap

Features 

Features of the voiced alveolar tap or flap:

 Its manner of articulation is tap or flap, which means it is produced with a single contraction of the muscles so that the tongue makes very brief contact.
 Its place of articulation is dental or alveolar, which means it is articulated behind upper front teeth or at the alveolar ridge. It is most often apical, which means that it is pronounced with the tip of the tongue.

Occurrence

Alveolar nasal tap and flap

Features 
Features of the alveolar nasal tap or flap:

 Its manner of articulation is tap or flap, which means it is produced with a single contraction of the muscles so that the tongue makes very brief contact.

Occurrence

See also 
 Flapping
 Index of phonetics articles

Notes

References

External links
 

Alveolar consonants
Tap and flap consonants
Pulmonic consonants
Oral consonants
Central consonants